Never Far Away is a song title by multiple artists:

Arts, entertainment, and media

by Chris Cornell, on Scream (Chris Cornell album)
by Rush of Fools, on Wonder of the World (album)